Jean Théodore Dupas (21 February 1882 – 6 September 1964) was a French painter, artist, designer, poster artist, and decorator in the  Art Nouveau and Art Deco styles.

Life 
Dupas was born in Bordeaux. He won the Prix de Rome for painting in 1910.

Dupas has worked in various exponents of the Nouveau and Deco areas, such as the fashion magazine Vogue and Harper's Bazaar. In 1925 at the Exposition Internationale des Arts Décoratifs et Industriels Modernes in Paris, he showed Les Perruches, one of his most famous oil on canvas. In 1927, with the aide of French printing house , he conceived  a catalogue for the fur company Max.

In the 1930s, Dupas was commissioned by Frank Pick to produce the artwork for a series of posters for the underground network of London Transport.

Dupas expressed his predilection for large-scale projects: "The greater is my work, the happy I am." Thus his collaboration in the decor of famous steamships during the 1930s, emphasizing the Art Deco mode of the time. Among these works, the SS Île-de-France and the SS Liberté were among the first. But in 1935, with the help of glass master Champigneulle, he decorated the grand salon of the Normandie, in more than 400 square meters of painted and frosted glass.

He became a member of the Académie des Beaux-Arts in 1941.

Works 
Frescos of the Saint-Esprit church, Paris
Frescos of the d'Albert dans la Somme church
Palais royal de Bucarest
Collège Saint Louis, Paris
Frescos of the Claude Monet school, Paris
Great frescos of the La vigne et le vin, in the Aquitaine museum, Bordeaux
Two frescos in the viewing room at the Bordeaux Stock Market Exchange
La femme en rouge (1927), Musée des arts décoratifs, Paris
La fontaine italienne (1926), Musée de Beauvais
Le char de l'aurore. This last panel constitute of Normandie which was exposed at the Metropolitan Museum of Art in the 2005 exhibition, Art Deco Paris. Today is housed at the Carnegie Museum of Art, Pittsburgh.
Musée Antoine-Lécuyer, Saint Quentin
Musée des arts décoratifs, Bordeaux

References

Sources 
Jacqueline du Pasquier, Bordeaux Art Déco, Éditions Somogy, 1997
Affiches de Jean Dupas. Catalogue de l'exposition, Bordeaux, 1987
Les Pages d'or de l'édition française, Mairie de Paris, 1988
Patricia Bayer, Art déco. Le livre, Éditions Florilège, 1988
Louis René Vian, Les Arts décoratifs à bord des paquebots français, Éditions Fonmare, 1992

Links
 Bridgeman Images
 Jean Dupas sur Artcyclopedia

1882 births
1964 deaths
French male painters
20th-century French painters
20th-century French male artists
Art Nouveau painters
Art Nouveau designers
Art Nouveau illustrators
French illustrators
French designers
French poster artists
Artists from Bordeaux
Art Deco artists
Prix de Rome for painting
Members of the Académie des beaux-arts